Rodrigo Jesús López (born 29 March 2002) is a Paraguayan footballer who plays as a midfielder for Club Libertad.

Career statistics

Club

Notes

References

2002 births
Living people
Association football midfielders
Paraguayan footballers
Paraguayan Primera División players
Club Libertad footballers